Mount Barrille  is a  mountain summit located in the Alaska Range, in Denali National Park and Preserve, in the U.S. state of Alaska. It is situated 2,650 feet above the Ruth Glacier at the gateway to the Don Sheldon Amphitheater, or The Great Gorge, depending on direction of travel. The mountain was named by famed explorer Dr. Frederick Cook for Edward Barrill (1861-1946), a horse packer from Darby, Montana, who was his sole companion during his 1906 claim to be the first to climb Mount McKinley. The claim was later disproved, and in 1909 Barrill signed an affidavit stating that they had not reached the summit. Cook referred to his companion as Barrille in his accounts of the expedition, and Barrille remains as the official spelling used by the United States Geological Survey.

Climbing

Despite its relatively low elevation, Mt. Barrille is notable for its imposing east face with nearly 2,600 feet of vertical sheer granite. It is one of the more frequently climbed peaks in the Ruth Gorge owing in part to its proximity to the air taxi landing area and the Sheldon Chalet immediately west of the peak. There are several climbing routes with different ranges of technical difficulty. The Japanese Couloir is a moderate, Alaska grade III route featuring steep 55-70 degree angle snow and ice. The first ascent of this route was made in 1976 by Teruaki Segawa, Kensei Suga, Masayuki Suemasa, and Eiji Tsai.

Another popular route to the summit is the Cobra Pillar, a direct line up the central pillar of the east face. Named for its resemblance to a cobra from certain angles, this route is rated YDS 5.11. The first ascent of this route was made by Jim Donini and Jack Tackle over six days in June 1991. The first one-day speed ascent of the route was made in June 2004 by Joe Puryear and Chris McNamara.

The Baked Alaskan route is on the east face and is rated 5.10+. The first ascent was made by Brian Teale and Scott Thelen in July 2001.

The west aspect of the mountain is covered by glacial ice and gentle enough to be descended by skiing.

See also

Mountain peaks of Alaska
Fake Peak

Gallery

References

External links
 Barrill and Dr. Cook: American Alpine Club Publications
 Weather: Mount Barrille
 NOAA weather: Talkeetna
 Skiing west slope: YouTube
 Summit photo panorama: National Park Service

Alaska Range
Mountains of Matanuska-Susitna Borough, Alaska
Mountains of Denali National Park and Preserve
Mountains of Alaska
Climbing areas of Alaska
North American 2000 m summits